Hans Fahsl (15 August 1941 – 3 August 2017) was a German athlete. He competed in the men's hammer throw at the 1964 Summer Olympics and the 1968 Summer Olympics.

References

External links
 

1941 births
2017 deaths
Athletes (track and field) at the 1964 Summer Olympics
Athletes (track and field) at the 1968 Summer Olympics
German male hammer throwers
Olympic athletes of the United Team of Germany
Olympic athletes of West Germany
Sportspeople from Duisburg